General elections were held in Malta between 8 and 11 October 1883. All but one of the elected Council members were members of the Anti-Reform Party.

Background
The elections were held under the 1849 constitution, which provided for an 18-member Government Council, of which ten members would be appointed and eight elected.

Results
A total of 10,637 people were registered to vote, of which just 2,749 cast votes, giving a turnout of 26%.

References

1883
Malta
1883 in Malta
October 1883 events